Tomislav Grčić (born 5 July 1986) is a Croatian football player, who most recently played for Maceratese.

External links
 Stats in Croatian

1986 births
Living people
Footballers from Split, Croatia
Croatian footballers
Association football defenders
Association football midfielders
HNK Hajduk Split players
NK Mosor players
NK Imotski players
HNK Trogir players
S.S. Maceratese 1922 players
Croatian Football League players
Croatian expatriate footballers
Expatriate footballers in Italy
Croatian expatriate sportspeople in Italy